Curt-Jordan Perez Dizon (born 4 February 1994) is a professional footballer who plays as a forward for Malaysia Super League club Penang and the Philippines national team.

Early life
Curt Dizon is the son of two Filipino parents, Cris Dizon and Joy Perez. He was born and raised in London.

Club career
Before heading to the Philippines, his football career started off in a local team where he was spotted by Brunswick, which soon became his next club. After a long run at Brunswick, Dizon was scouted and signed for Crystal Palace F.C. and played for the Under-16s team. He then continued with his passion for football alongside his education and attended Queen's Academy in Watford. The school is known for their highly immersive sports facility which conjoint with education. He left with three A-Levels and more knowledge of football.

Dizon then played for Gimnástica Segoviana CF in Spain when he was 19. After being called up to the national team in early 2014, Dizon signed for Global F.C. of the United Football League. The following year, Global and Loyola Meralco Sparks F.C. have come to an agreement to transfer Dizon in exchange of Loyola's midfielder Matthew Hartmann. Loyola changed their name to F.C. Meralco Manila when it joined the Philippines Football League in 2017.

On 6 May 2017, Dizon scored a historic goal from Alvin Sarmiento's pass to open the score in the 9th minute for the F.C. Meralco Manila against Stallion Laguna F.C. at Biñan Stadium in Biñan, Laguna, making him the first-ever scorer of the newly inaugurated Philippines Football League. He was left without a club after Meralco Manila was disbanded in January 2018.

In January 2018, Dizon's former club, Global, now known as Global Cebu F.C., signed him after Meralco Manila's disbandment. The signing was announced through the club's official social media pages.

He was released by Global and was signed by Ceres–Negros F.C. in July 2018. Which he then won the Philippines Football League.

In July 2019, Dizon joined Chonburi in the Thai League 1.

In February 2020, Philippines national team manager Dan Palami announced that Dizon will be joining the Azkals Development Team (ADT), a new team that is set to participate in the 2020 season of the Philippines Football League. However, when the season began in October, he was not in the squad.

In December 2020, Dizon and OJ Porteria were signed by Ratchaburi Mitr Phol in the Thai League 1.

International career
Dizon scored in his debut with the Philippines on 11 April 2014 in a 3-0 home win against Nepal. 

On 20 March 2015, it was announced that Dizon was called up to the Philippines U-23 team for the 2016 AFC U-23 Championship qualification phase in Thailand.

International goals
Scores and results list the Philippines' goal tally first.

Honours
Global
 United Football League Division I (1): 2014

References

External links
 

1994 births
Living people
Footballers from Greater London
English people of Filipino descent
Filipino British sportspeople
British Asian footballers
Filipino footballers
Citizens of the Philippines through descent
Philippines international footballers
Association football wingers
Association football forwards
Global Makati F.C. players
Tercera División players
Curt Dizon
Curt Dizon
F.C. Meralco Manila players
Penang F.C. players
Curt Dizon
Filipino expatriate footballers
Filipino expatriate sportspeople in Spain
Filipino expatriate sportspeople in Thailand
Expatriate footballers in Spain
Expatriate footballers in Thailand
2019 AFC Asian Cup players
Azkals Development Team players